Ignatius Kung Pin-Mei (2 August 1901 – 12 March 2000) was the Catholic Bishop of Shanghai, China, from 1950 until his death in 2000. He spent 30 years in Chinese prisons for defying attempts by China's Communist government to control Catholics in the country through the government-approved Catholic Patriotic Association. At the time of his death he was the oldest member of the College of Cardinals.

Biography 
On September 8, 1955, Kung, along with several hundred priests and Church leaders, was arrested and imprisoned. He was sentenced five years later to life imprisonment for counter-revolutionary activities.

Kung was secretly named a Cardinal in pectore in the consistory of 1979 by Pope John Paul II. The formula in pectore is used when a pope names a cardinal without announcing it publicly in order to protect the safety of the cardinal and his congregation. After he was released in 1986, he was kept under house arrest until 1988. Kung learned he was a cardinal during a private meeting with the Pope in Vatican City in 1988, and his membership in the College of Cardinals was made public in 1991. By then, he had reached 80, so he did not have the right to participate in a conclave. Kung left China in 1988 and settled in the United States.

He died in 2000, aged 98, from stomach cancer in Stamford, Connecticut. His funeral was held at St. John the Evangelist Church (now the Basilica of Saint John the Evangelist) in Stamford with Cardinal James Francis Stafford, President of the Pontifical Council for the Laity, presiding. Kung's body was then transported to Star of the Sea Church in San Francisco, California, for a Low Mass with Cardinal Paul Shan Kuo-hsi of Taiwan presiding. A requiem Pontifical High Mass using the Tridentine Liturgy in Latin was said the following day at Five Wounds Parish in San Jose, California, with Cardinal Shan again presiding. Kung is interred next to Dominic Tang, S.J. (Archbishop of Canton, China) at Santa Clara Mission Cemetery in Santa Clara, California.

References

Further reading 
 Paul Philip Mariani. Church Militant Bishop Kung and Catholic Resistance in Communist Shanghai. (Cambridge, MA.: Harvard University Press,  2011).   .

External links
Cardinal Kung Pin Mei Foundation, website
Cardinal Kung Academy, website
Profile on Catholic hierarchy 
Cardinal Wung on ''First Things

Chinese cardinals
Deaths from stomach cancer
20th-century Roman Catholic bishops in China
Servants of God
20th-century venerated Christians
1901 births
2000 deaths
Deaths from cancer in Connecticut
Burials at Mission Santa Clara de Asís
Cardinals created by Pope John Paul II
People from Shanghai
Roman Catholic bishops in Shanghai
Chinese anti-communists